The Department of the Special Minister of State was an Australian government department that existed between December 1972 and December 1975.

History
The Department was one of several new Departments established by the Whitlam Government, a wide restructuring that revealed some of the new government's program.

Scope
Information about the department's functions and/or government funding allocation could be found in the Administrative Arrangements Orders, the annual Portfolio Budget Statements and in the Department's annual reports.

The functions of the Department at its creation were:
National Archives
National Library
Royal Charters
War Graves
Grants to National organisations
World Expositions
Commonwealth Gazette and Commonwealth Directory

Structure
The Department was a Commonwealth Public Service department, staffed by officials who were responsible to the Special Minister of State.

References

Special Minister of State
Australia, Special Minister of State